Cricket is a popular sport which is played across the British Isles, particularly in England, where the game was first developed. Like many sports, cricket is organised separately within the individual Home Nations, which all compete separately at various levels within the international cricket structure of the International Cricket Council.

England and Wales

Cricket in England and Wales is regulated though the England and Wales Cricket Board. The England cricket team (which also represents Wales, with Welsh players eligible to play) is a founding Test and One Day International nation. It played its first test match against Australia in 1877 and played its first One Day International (ODI) also against Australia in 1971. One of the main cricket grounds in England, and also widely regarded as the spiritual home of cricket, is Lord's Cricket Ground in London. Other major cricket grounds include The Oval (also in London), Edgbaston in Birmingham, Old Trafford in Manchester and Trent Bridge in Nottingham. From 1909 until 2017 England was the only country within the British Isles to have full membership of the ICC and therefore Test Status.

Ireland

Cricket in Ireland is regulated by Cricket Ireland on an all-Ireland basis, with a single cricket team representing the whole of the island of Ireland. Cricket Ireland was established in 1923 and was admitted as an Associate Member of the ICC in 1993. In 2005 Ireland hosted the ICC Trophy and came runners-up, thus qualifying for the 2007 Cricket World Cup which was being held in the West Indies for the very first time and during that tournament, surprised the cricketing world by progressing to the Super Eight stage of the competition after defeating Pakistan. Ireland also managed to qualify for both the 2011 and 2015 World Cups but failed to progress beyond the Group stage on both occasions. On 22 June 2017 Ireland was admitted as a Full Member of the ICC and therefore eligible to play Test matches.

Scotland

Isle of Man

Channel Islands

References